Rosedale Historic District is a national historic district located at Covington, Alleghany County, Virginia. The district encompasses 76 contributing buildings, 1 contributing site, and 2 contributing structures in a predominantly residential section of Alleghany County.  The buildings represent a variety of popular architectural styles including the Queen Anne, Greek Revival, and Classical Revival styles. The most notable residence is Rose Dale, constructed in the late-1850s as a plantation house. The Rosedale neighborhood was in established in 1899–1900.  In addition to the dwellings a former hospital is situated in the district.

It was added to the National Register of Historic Places in 1998.

Gallery

References

Historic districts in Alleghany County, Virginia
Greek Revival architecture in Virginia
Queen Anne architecture in Virginia
Neoclassical architecture in Virginia
National Register of Historic Places in Alleghany County, Virginia
Historic districts on the National Register of Historic Places in Virginia